William Tancred or Tankerd (by 1508 – 13 August 1573), of Boroughbridge, Yorkshire, was an English politician.

He was a Member (MP) of the Parliament of England for York in 1539 and for Boroughbridge in October 1553.

References

1573 deaths
People from Boroughbridge
Year of birth uncertain
English MPs 1539–1540
English MPs 1553 (Mary I)
Members of the Parliament of England for constituencies in Yorkshire